Roaring 20's is a 2021 French drama film directed by Elizabeth Vogler from a screenplay that she co-wrote with Joris Avodo, Noémie Schmidt and Francois Mark.

It had its world premiere at the Tribeca Film Festival in June 12, 2021.

Production
In April 2021, it was announced that Films Boutique acquired the distribution rights to the film.

The film was shot in one uninterrupted single sequence in Paris, France in mid 2020.

References

External links
 
 

2021 films
2021 drama films
French drama films
One-shot films
2020s English-language films
2020s French films